A heating system is a mechanism for maintaining temperatures at an acceptable level; by using thermal energy within a home, office, or other dwelling. Often part of an HVAC (heating, ventilation, air conditioning) system. A heating system may be a central heating system or distributed.

See also
 HVAC
 Boiler
 Radiator
 Solar energy
 Heating plant

Heating